The 2008 USA Sevens competition took place on February 9 and 10 at Petco Park in San Diego, California. It was the fourth Cup trophy in the 2007-08 IRB Sevens World Series. The USA Sevens is played annually as part of the IRB Sevens World Series for international rugby sevens. 

The top-level Cup competition was won by New Zealand, who became the first team in the history of the IRB Sevens to win the first four tournaments of a season; it was also the Kiwis' sixth consecutive tournament win overall. In the Cup semifinal against Kenya, they made history with their 35th consecutive match win in the IRB Sevens, breaking their own record set in 2001/02. They took the record to 36 with their final win over South Africa.

The second-level Plate was won by Fiji in a sudden-death extra time thriller against Argentina. In the Bowl final, Wales beat the hosts in another thriller, in which the USA scored a try after the final horn, but missed the conversion that would have sent the match to extra time. The remaining trophy, the Shield, went to Australia.

The New Zealand brewery Steinlager was the presenting sponsor for this tournament.

Pool stages

Pool A
{| class="wikitable" style="text-align: center;"
|-
!width="200"|Team
!width="40"|Pld
!width="40"|W
!width="40"|D
!width="40"|L
!width="40"|PF
!width="40"|PA
!width="40"|+/-
!width="40"|Pts
|- 
|align=left| 
|3||3||0||0||85||0||+85||9
|-
|align=left| 
|3||1||0||2||31||53||−22||5 
|-
|align=left| 
|3||1||0||2||38||65||−27||5
|-
|align=left| 
|3||1||0||2||21||57||−36||5
|}

Pool B
{| class="wikitable" style="text-align: center;"
|-
!width="200"|Team
!width="40"|Pld
!width="40"|W
!width="40"|D
!width="40"|L
!width="40"|PF
!width="40"|PA
!width="40"|+/-
!width="40"|Pts
|-
|align=left| 
|3||3||0||0||69||29||+40||9 
|-
|align=left| 
|3||2||0||1||109||35||+74||7
|-
|align=left| 
|3||1||0||2||59||46||+13||5
|-
|align=left| 
|3||0||0||3||17||144||−127||3
|}

Pool C
{| class="wikitable" style="text-align: center;"
|-
!width="200"|Team
!width="40"|Pld
!width="40"|W
!width="40"|D
!width="40"|L
!width="40"|PF
!width="40"|PA
!width="40"|+/-
!width="40"|Pts
|-
|align=left| 
|3||3||0||0||76||31||+45||9
|-
|align=left| 
|3||2||0||1||69||26||+43||7 
|-
|align=left| 
|3||1||0||2||66||48||+18||5
|-
|align=left| 
|3||0||0||3||7||113||−106||3
|}

Pool D
{| class="wikitable" style="text-align: center;"
|-
!width="200"|Team
!width="40"|Pld
!width="40"|W
!width="40"|D
!width="40"|L
!width="40"|PF
!width="40"|PA
!width="40"|+/-
!width="40"|Pts
|-
|align=left| 
|3||3||0||0||90||31||+59||9 
|- 
|align=left| 
|3||2||0||1||99||14||+85||7
|-
|align=left| 
|3||1||0||2||73||64||+9||5
|-
|align=left| 
|3||0||0||3||0||141||−141||3
|}

Knockout

Shield

Bowl

Plate

Cup

References

External links
 Official site of tournament organizers
 USA Sevens on irb.com
 IRB Sevens World Series
 USA Sevens on MySpace

2007–08 IRB Sevens World Series
Sports in San Diego
2008 
2008 in American rugby union
2008 in sports in California
2008 rugby sevens competitions